Triethylgallium is the organogallium compound with the formul Ga(C2H5)3.  Also called TEGa, it is a metalorganic source of gallium for metalorganic vapour phase epitaxy (MOVPE) of compound semiconductors.  It is a colorless pyrophoric liquid, typically handled with air-free techniques.

Preparation and reactions
The main routes involve alkylation of gallium trichloride.  When this alkylation is effected with ethyl Grignard reagent in ether, the product is the diethyl ether adduct of triethylgallium.  The ether is not easily removed.  Thus an alternative route involves transmetalation with triethylaluminium according to this simplified equation:

Triethylgallium readily converts to the air-stable, colorless alkoxide by two routes, oxygenation and alcoholysis:

The sweet odor associated with triethylgallium is due to the alkoxide.

Redistribution reactions occur with gallium trichloride:

Applications
TEGa can be a useful alternative to trimethylgallium in the metalorganic vapour phase epitaxy of compound semiconductors because films grown using TEGa have been shown to have a lower carbon impurity concentration.

Related compounds
Trimethylgallium, with similar properties.

References

Gallium compounds
Chemical vapour deposition precursors